A penumbral lunar eclipse took place on Wednesday, June 13, 1984, the second of three lunar eclipses in 1984. This minor penumbral eclipse was visually imperceptible, but marks the first lunar eclipse in Saros series 149.

Visibility

Related lunar eclipses

Eclipses of 1984 
 A penumbral lunar eclipse on May 15.
 An annular solar eclipse on May 30.
 A penumbral lunar eclipse on June 13.
 A penumbral lunar eclipse on November 8.
 A total solar eclipse on November 22.

Lunar year series

See also 
List of lunar eclipses
List of 20th-century lunar eclipses

Notes

External links 
 

1984-06
1984 in science
June 1984 events